Southport is a seaside town in Sefton, Merseyside, England.  It contains 175 buildings that are recorded in the National Heritage List for England as designated listed buildings.   Of these, three are listed at Grade II*, the middle of the three grades, and the others are at Grade II, the lowest grade.  There are no buildings listed at Grade I.

Southport did not develop as a town until the late 18th century.  Before that it contained only small settlements and fishermen's cottages.  Most of the listed buildings are located to the north of the present town centre and consist mainly of small houses, many of them in a single storey, rendered or roughcast, and with thatched or slated roofs.  As the town developed and grew, its larger buildings were constructed, including villas, shops, churches, and public buildings.  The major thoroughfare in the town is Lord Street, a wide road running north–south mainly with shops on the west side, and gardens and public buildings on the east side.  A feature of the shops is that a high proportion are fronted by verandahs in cast iron and glass.  Many of the shops are listed, and most of the verandahs are also listed, but separately from the shops.  The listed public buildings on the east side of the road include the Town Hall, the Atkinson Art Gallery and Library, and the Southport Arts Centre.  Also on this side of the road is an extensive War Memorial.  A pier was built in 1859–60, and from 1885 the foreshore was developed, with its Marine Lake, which is surrounded by listed cast iron shelters.  Also on the Promenade were built hotels, a hospital, and swimming baths.

Key

Buildings

References

Citations

Sources

Listed buildings in Merseyside
Lists of listed buildings in Merseyside